Mandeep Punia is a young freelance journalist based in Haryana. He was arrested by Delhi Police during 2020-2021 Indian farmers' protest, India. He sent to Tihar Jail for 14 day. Indian Journalists protest against Punia arrest in the front of Delhi Police headquarter.

Early life and education 

Punia's home town is Jhajjar, Haryana. He done his graduation from Panjab University, Chandigarh. He studies journalism from Indian Institute of Mass Communication (IIMC) during 2016–17.

References

Indian journalists
Indian Institute of Mass Communication alumni
Living people
Year of birth missing (living people)